Golzow (bei Eberswalde) station is a railway station in the Golzow district of the municipality of Chorin, located in the Barnim district in Brandenburg, Germany.

References

Railway stations in Brandenburg
Buildings and structures in Barnim